2067 is a year in the 2060s decade

2067 may also refer to:

2067 Aksnes, an outer main-belt asteroid
2067 (album), 2004 album by Rheostatics
2067 (film), 2020 Australian film
 The year 2067 BC in the 21st century BC